Malonogometni klub Uspinjača Zagreb is a futsal club based in Zagreb, Croatia.

Honours
1 European Clubs Championship: 1989
4 Croatian League: 1992, 1993, 1995, 1996
3 Croatian Cup: 1996, 1997, 2007
1 Yugoslavian League: 1990

See also
Futsal in Croatia

External links
Official Website

Futsal clubs in Croatia
Football clubs in Zagreb
Futsal clubs established in 1983